David Thompson is an Australian chef, restaurateur and cookery writer, known for his skill and expertise in Thai cuisine.

Career
Thompson made his name at Darley Street Thai in Sydney, which he opened in 1992 in Darley St, Newtown upon his return from living and working in Bangkok for several years. He then opened Sailors Thai in 1995, also in Sydney. The success of these restaurants got him noticed by Singaporean hotelier Christina Ong, who asked him to open a restaurant in one of her COMO hotels.

Nahm opened in 2001 in The Halkin hotel in London, and received a Michelin star within six months. It was the first Thai restaurant to gain this award. Thompson received the "London Chef of the Year" award at the Carlton Evening Standard Food Awards in 2003.

In 2010, he opened a second branch of Nahm in another hotel belonging to the COMO Hotels group, the Metropolitan in Bangkok. In 2012 Thompson closed Nahm London to concentrate on Nahm Bangkok. In 2014, Nahm was listed as Asia's best restaurant and remained on the World's 50 Best Restaurants list for seven consecutive years. Nahm was awarded a Michelin star in 2017 when the Michelin Guide first included restaurants in Thailand.

In 2014, Thompson founded the Aylmer Aaharn Thai food group which came to manage operations across six countries including Thailand and Australia. In that year Thompson was also the headline chef for the inaugural Wonder Feasts series at the first Wonderfruit festival, in Thailand.

In 2015, Thompson was interviewed on Bloomberg Television series High Flyers in Singapore.

In 2015 Thompson commenced a chain of low-key Thai restaurants with Long Chim Singapore and Long Chim Perth. Branches in Sydney (2016), Melbourne (2017) and Seoul (2018) followed. The Singapore and Melbourne restaurants closed in 2019 and the Seoul restaurant in 2020.

In 2016 Thompson was recognised with the Lifetime Achievement Award at Asia's 50 Best Restaurants Awards for his dedication and commitment to Thai cuisine.

In 2018, Thompson left Nahm Bangkok and opened another Thai restaurant, Aaharn, in Hong Kong.

Personal life
Thompson is married to his Thai business partner, Tanongsak Yordwai.

Books
Thompson has also written three books. The first, Classic Thai Cuisine was published in 1993.  The second, Thai Food, a comprehensive account of Thai cuisine, covering its history and role in society, as well as numerous recipes and menus, was released in 2002. His third book, Thai Street Food, is a collection of his favourite 100 recipes of the street.

References

External links
Article about David Thompson
David Thompson in an interview with The Guardian: One night in Bangkok on the trail of Thai street food
David Thompson Q&A with DestinAsian

Australian chefs
Living people
Thai cuisine
Australian food writers
Cookbook writers
Head chefs of Michelin starred restaurants
Year of birth missing (living people)
People from Sydney
James Beard Foundation Award winners